Gunnar Gundersen may refer to:

Gunnar Gundersen (politician) (born 1956), Norwegian politician and Olympic swimmer
Gunnar S. Gundersen (1921–1983), Norwegian modernist painter. 
Gunnar Gundersen (chess player) (1882–1943), Australian chess master
Gunnar Bull Gundersen (1929–1993), Norwegian sailor, novelist, playwright and lyricist
Gunnar Edvard Gundersen (1927–2017), Norwegian economist, politician and organizational leader